Thela was a short-lived rock band from New Zealand. It was formed in 1992 and consisted of Dion Workman, Rosy Parlane, and Dean Roberts. They released two LPs on Thurston Moore's Ecstatic Peace label. Following the band's demise in 1996, all three members undertook solo projects. Parlane and Workman also worked together under the name Parmentier.

Discography
 (1995) Untitled (Ecstatic Peace)
 (1996) Argentina (Ecstatic Peace)

References

External links
 Biography and interview with Thela (September 1995) at Noise: NZ/Japan
 Discography of Thela at Discogs

New Zealand rock music groups